DXFM (101.9 FM), broadcasting as 101.9 Radyo5 News FM, is a radio station owned by the Nation Broadcasting Corporation and operated by TV5 Network Inc. The station's studio is located at TV5 Heights, Broadcast Ave., Shrine Hills, Matina, Davao City, while its transmitter is located at Brgy. San Pedro, Davao City.

History
The station was established in 1975 as MRS 101.9 Most Requested Song. It carried an adult contemporary format.

On September 1, 1998, after NBC was acquired by PLDT Beneficial Trust Fund's broadcasting division MediaQuest Holdings from the consortium of the Yabut family and then House Speaker Manny Villar, the station rebranded as Danni @ Rhythms 101.9 and switched to an urban contemporary format. On August 1, 2005, the "Rhythms" tag was dropped.

On October 1, 2009, Audiowav Media (WAV Atmospheric) took over the station's operations, along with NBC's stations in Visayas and Mindanao, and relaunched it as WAV FM. It carried a Top 40 format with the slogan "Philippines' Hit Music Station".

On December 1, 2011, TV5 took over the station's operations and relaunched it under the Radyo5 network. Initially a relay of Manila-based 92.3 News FM, the station launched its local programming on December 3, 2012.

In the late 2010s, Davao-based local media company KAMM Media Network took over the station's weekday morning slot under a blocktime agreement. To date, this is the only Radyo Singko station that does not simulcast Ted Failon at DJ Chacha sa Radyo5.

References

DXFM
News and talk radio stations in the Philippines
Radio stations established in 1975